The Smoke At Dawn is a 2014 book by Jeff Shaara, the third of four in a series covering the Western Theater of the American Civil War.

References

External links
 Jeff Shaara's Official Site

2014 American novels
Novels set during the American Civil War
Ballantine Books books
Novels by Jeffrey Shaara